This is a list of 106 species in the genus Stelis.

Stelis species

References